Uch may refer to:

Uch or Uch Sharif, located 75 km from Bahawalpur in Punjab province, Pakistan
Uch Drag, village in Badakhshan Province in north-eastern Afghanistan
Uch-Kul', town in the Osh Province of Kyrgyzstan
Uch-Korgon, Kyrgyzstan, village in the Batken Province of Kyrgyzstan
Uch-Kurgansk Hydro Power Plant, active hydro power project in Uch-Kurgansk, Kyrgyzstan
Uch Tepa, city district of Tashkent, Uzbekistan
Uch-Tyube, village in the Osh Province of Kyrgyzstan

See also 
UCH (disambiguation), initials

it:Uch